A reciprocal construction (abbreviated ) is a grammatical pattern in which each of the participants occupies both the role of agent and patient with respect to the other. An example is the English sentence John and Mary criticized each other: John criticized Mary, and Mary criticized John. Reciprocal constructions can be said to express mutual relationships.

Many languages, such as Semitic languages, Altaic languages or Bantu languages, have special reciprocal affixes in verbs. For example, Turkish reciprocal constructions which might also have slightly different meanings than the verbs they originate from, have the suffix -iş (-ış, -uş or -üş depending on the vowel harmony):

 

Other languages, including English, use reciprocal pronouns such as "each other" to indicate a mutual relation. Latin uses the preposition inter and its reflexive pronoun inter se (between themselves) when the verb is third person. Most Indo-European languages do not have special reciprocal affixes on verbs, and mutual relations are expressed through reflexive constructions or other mechanisms.  For example, Russian reciprocal constructions have the suffix -sja (-ся, 'self'), which also has reflexive and passive interpretations.

See also
Reciprocal pronoun
Reflexive verb

External links
 Haspelmath, Martin. 2007. Further remarks on reciprocal constructions. In: Nedjalkov, Vladimir P. (ed.) Reciprocal constructions. 5 vols. Amsterdam: Benjamins, 2087-2115.

Transitivity and valency
Semantics